Air Chief Marshal Georgios Avlonitis (born 24 January 1950) is a retired Greek Air Force officer and former Chief of the Hellenic Air Force General Staff.

Avlonitis was born in Athens on 24 January 1950. He entered the Hellenic Air Force Academy in 1969 and graduated on 6 August 1973. He served in several command and staff positions, both in the Greek armed forces and in NATO. He served as Chief of the Air Force Training Command before being promoted to Air Marshal and assuming command of the Air Force General Staff on 13 September 2004. He served in this post for three years, retiring on 25 January 2007 with the rank of Air Chief Marshal.

Sources
 CV at the official website of the Hellenic Air Force

 

1950 births
Living people
Military personnel from Athens
Hellenic Air Force air marshals
Grand Commanders of the Order of the Phoenix (Greece)
Grand Commanders of the Order of Honour (Greece)
20th-century Greek military personnel
21st-century Greek military personnel
Chiefs of the Hellenic Air Force General Staff